Vardy v Rooney: A Courtroom Drama is a Channel 4 two-part courtroom drama based on the Wagatha Christie events and subsequent high-profile court case.

Premise
The mini series will recreate the English High Court defamation case between the two figures Rebekah Vardy and Coleen Rooney from 2022 with the focus on the opposing legal teams. The case arose after Rooney accused Vardy of leaking posts from her private Instagram account to The Sun newspaper resulting in Vardy suing Rooney for libel.

Cast

 Natalia Tena as Rebekah Vardy
 Chanel Cresswell as Coleen Rooney 
 Michael Sheen as barrister David Sherborne
 Simon Coury as barrister Hugh Tomlinson
 Dion Lloyd as footballer Wayne Rooney
 Marci Nagyszokolyai as footballer Jamie Vardy

Production
In July 2022 it was announced that Channel 4 would produce a 2-part drama based on the events of the high-profile trial. Vardy v Rooney: A Courtroom Drama, directed by Oonagh Kearney, which would recreate courtroom scenes using verbatim court transcripts against analysis from the media.

Release
The series aired on 21 December 2022 on Channel 4 in the UK.

References

External links

2022 British television series debuts
2022 British television series endings
2020s British drama television series
2020s British television miniseries
Channel 4 television dramas
Television series based on actual events
English-language television shows